Bold Rock is a hard cider company headquartered in Nellysford, Virginia with additional locations in Charlottesville, Virginia, Crozet, Virginia and Mills River, North Carolina.

History 
It was founded by John Washburn and Brian Shanks in 2012.  Washburn and Shanks started Bold Rock using only fresh-pressed Blue Ridge Mountain apples to ensure the best-tasting cider. The apples come from local orchards close to their two cideries. The craft ciders contain no additives and produce very limited waste, resulting in 85 percent of every apple becoming juice.

The company has won over 100 awards. The company has expanded into other beverages, including hard tea and hard lemonade, in a variety of flavors.

Bold Rock Hard Cider is distributed throughout Washington, D.C., Maryland, Delaware, Pennsylvania, Virginia, West Virginia, Tennessee, North Carolina, South Carolina and Georgia.

References

External links
 Official Website
Reviews
 TripAdvisor
 Untappd
 Yelp

Alcoholic drinks
American ciders
American companies established in 2012
Food and drink companies established in 2012
2012 establishments in Virginia
Nelson County, Virginia